Larry Turner (January 16, 1939 – November 27, 2009) was an American politician. He served as a Democratic member of the Tennessee House of Representatives from 1985 until his death. He represented the 85th district, which is composed of part of Shelby County.

Turner was a member of the Consumer and Employee Affairs Committee, the House Education Committee, the House K-12 Subcommittee, the House Consumer Affairs Subcommittee, the House Employee Affairs Subcommittee, and the Joint TACIR Committee. Turner was also the Secretary of the House Democratic Caucus. He is a former chairman of the Shelby County Delegation.

Turner was born in 1939 in West Memphis, Arkansas. He graduated from Memphis State University with a Bachelor of Science degree in Accounting and Real Estate. He was the owner of the Larry Turner and Associates Realty Company. He was also a veteran of the U.S. Air Force.

Turner died November 27, 2009 at Methodist University Hospital following a short, unexpected illness and laid to rest at West Tennessee Veterans Cemetery in Memphis, Tennessee.

References

1939 births
2009 deaths
Democratic Party members of the Tennessee House of Representatives
20th-century American politicians
African-American state legislators in Tennessee
20th-century African-American politicians
21st-century African-American people